Woman with Gloria Steinem is a Viceland documentary TV series featuring Gloria Steinem.  The series focused on stories relating to the status of women around the world.

In 2016 the series was nominated for the Primetime Emmy Award for Outstanding Documentary or Nonfiction Series, an award ultimately won by Making a Murderer.

References

External links

2010s American documentary television series
Viceland original programming